Ben Miller (born 1966) is an English comedian and actor.

Ben or  Benjamin Miller may also refer to:

Ben Miller, better known by his stage name Wrekonize, British-American rapper, member of hip-hop group ¡Mayday!
Ben Miller (musician), American guitarist
Ben Miller (footballer), Australian rules footballer 
Benjamin Miller (figure skater) (born 1983), American figure skater
Benjamin M. Miller (1864–1944), American politician
Benjamin K. Miller (judge) (born 1938), justice of the Illinois Supreme Court
Benjamin Kurtz Miller (1857–1928), philatelist, donated the Benjamin Miller Collection to the New York Public Library

See also
Ben Millers, a U.S. soccer club